Dysaethria conflictaria, or Epiplema conflictaria, is a moth of the family Uraniidae first described by Francis Walker in 1861. It is found in Indo-Australian tropics of India, Sri Lanka, Thailand, Papua New Guinea, the Solomon Islands and Australia.

Its wingspan is 2 cm. The wings are plain dark grey with zigzag brown lines across each wing. Hindwing margin has two tails.

Host plants include Cananga odorata and Artabotrys siamensis.

References

Moths of Asia
Moths described in 1861
Uraniidae